This is a list of rural localities in Leningrad Oblast. Leningrad Oblast is a federal subject of Russia (an oblast). It was established on August 1, 1927, although it was not until 1946 that the oblast's borders were settled in their present position. The oblast was named after the city of Leningrad (now St. Petersburg). The most populous town of the oblast is Gatchina, with 88,659 inhabitants (as of the 2002 Census).

Gatchinsky District 
Localities in Gatchinsky District include:

 Bolshekolpanskoe Rural Settlement
 Lampovo

Kingiseppsky District 
Localities in Kingiseppsky District include:

 Itsipino
 Ust-Luga
 Vistino

Kirishsky District 
Localities in Kirishsky District include:

Avdetovo

Kirovsky District 
Localities in Kirovsky District include:

 Lezye

Lomonosovsky District 
Localities in Lomonosovsky District include:

 Gostilitsy
 Koporye
 Peniki
 Ropsha

Luzhsky District 
Localities in Luzhsky District include:

 Zalustezhye

Priozersky District 
Localities in Priozersky District include:

 Gromovo
 Ivanovo
 Krivko
 Losevo
 Melnikovo
 Michurinskoye
 Novozhilovo
 Orekhovo (settlement)
 Orekhovo (village)
 Otradnoye
 Petrovskoye
 Platforma 69-y km
 Sapyornoye
 Sevastyanovo
 Solovyovo
 Sosnovo
 Zaporozhskoye

Tikhvinsky District 
Localities in Tikhvinsky District include:

 Abramovo
 Valdost

Tosnensky District 
Localities in Tosnensky District include:

 Avati
 Telmana

Volkhovsky District 
Localities in Volkhovsky District include:

Kikerino
 Staraya Ladoga

Volosovsky District 
Localities in Volosovsky District include:

 Kikerino

Vsevolozhsky District 
Localities in Vsevolozhsky District include:

Agalatovo
Kirjasalo - abandoned
Kokkorevo
Lembolovo
Romanovka
Vaganovo
Vaskelovo

Vyborgsky District 
Localities in Vyborgsky District include:

 Baryshevo
 Gavrilovo
 Kamenka
 Kirillovskoye
 Korobitsyno
 Lebyazhye
 Leypyasuo
 Lipovka
 Mukhino
 Ozyorskoye
 Paltsevo
 Pervomayskoye
 Pionerskoye
 Pobeda
 Polyany
 Pravdino
 Pribylovo
 Seleznyovo
 Staroselye
 Sveklovichnoye
 Sverdlovo
 Svobodnoye
 Usadishche
 Veshchevo
 Vozrozhdeniye
 Yashino
 Zaytsevo
 Zhitkovo

See also 
 
 Lists of rural localities in Russia

References 

Leningrad Oblast